Cymindis avenae is a species of ground beetle in the subfamily Harpalinae. It was described by J. R. Sahlberg in 1908.

References

avenae
Beetles described in 1908